The Legend of Cocaine Island is a 2018 documentary film, directed and produced by Theo Love. The film is produced under the banner of Sidestilt and is distributed by Netflix.

Synopsis 
A family man with no drug running experience searches the Caribbean island of Culebra for a lost stash of cocaine said to be worth at least $2 million.

Cast 

 Rodney Hyden as Rodney Hyden
 Andy Culpepper as Andy

Reception 
The site's critical consensus reads, "Rodney Hyden's quixotic quest for riches makes The Legend of Cocaine Island a mirthful adventure, although director Theo Love's stylistic flourishes are often counterproductive in conveying the inherent interest of this true story." Adrian Horton of The Guardian wrote, "For one, hammy, winking re-enactments comprise a solid half, if not more, of the film, frequently pushing it toward the realm of dramedy, not always pleasantly". Michael Mckinney of FanBolt wrote, "Director Theo Love treats Rodney with respect and doesn’t make him the bad guy".

References

External links 

 
 

2018 films
Netflix original documentary films
2010s English-language films